Blanche Channel is a strait and waterway in the Western Province of the Solomon Islands. 

It lies between New Georgia Island and Vangunu island on the northeast, and Rendova Island and Tetepare Island on the southwest. 

The channel opens to the Solomon Sea at both its east and west ends.

See also

References

Straits of the Solomon Islands
Western Province (Solomon Islands)